The 2020–21 Maltese Challenge League (referred to as the BOV Challenge League for sponsorship reasons), is the second-level of league football in Malta. This was the first season to take place under the new Challenge League brand.  

Following an announcement by Prime Minister Robert Abela, both the Premier League and Challenge League were suspended from 10 March to 11 April 2021 due to the amount of COVID-19 cases increasing in Malta. This was followed by a government decision to extend the suspension, leading to the MFA ending the season prematurely. Due to the season ending without 75% of matches having taken place, both promotion to the Premier League and relegation to the Amateur League (apart from Qormi, who had already been relegated during the season) was suspended until the following season. The following season will have 22 teams split into two groups with the top two clubs earning promotion.

Teams 
Fifteen teams competed in the league which included the two teams promoted from the Second Division.

League table

Results

References

External links 
 Official website

Maltese Premier League seasons
Malta
1